The 1974 Rally of Portugal (formally the 8º TAP Rallye de Portugal) was the first round of the 1974 World Rally Championship season after the oil crisis forced the cancellation of the Monte Carlo and Swedish rallies.

Report 
As with all of the WRC rounds in 1974, there was only a manufacturer championship, so only manufacturers results were counted for points. Only the top finishing car for each manufacturer counted. Fiat locked out the podium places but only picked up 20 points in the championship due to this rule. An advantage is gained though, because the next finishing manufacturer can only pick up the points available for where their driver finished - in this case Ove Andersson took 10 points for 4th place in a Toyota Corolla.

Results 

Source: Independent WRC archive

Championship standings after the event

References

External links
 Official website of the World Rally Championship
 1974 Portugal Rally at Rallye-info 

Rally de Portugal
Portugal
Rally